Gerry A. Dick is an American journalist and former news anchor at WRTV, a television station in Indianapolis, Indiana. He is best known as the current host of Inside INdiana Business, a television program owned by Grow Indiana Media Ventures, founded by Dick along with technology business owner Scott A. Jones.

History

Early years 
Born in Clinton, Indiana, Dick attended Indiana State University where he earned his Bachelor of Science degree in Radio-TV-Film. Following his education, he worked for television station WRTV as a journalist and news anchor, where he was nominated for an Emmy Award for his 1993 stories regarding Indiana companies doing business along the United States southern border.  After 14 years at the network, he acted as the Senior Vice President for Indianapolis Economic Development Corporation. Additionally, Dick has also held journalist positions at Indiana television stations in both Fort Wayne and Terre Haute.

Grow Indiana Media Ventures 
In 2000, Grow Indiana Media Ventures was started to provide business news focused on the state of Indiana. With Jones serving as chairman of the company, Dick serves as the managing editor in addition to acting as the host of Inside INdiana Business with Gerry Dick.  The work is dubbed by Indiana State University and Indianapolis television station WFYI as the "most watched local business television program" in the state.

Trivia 
Dick is active in central Indiana in addition to supporting his alma mater. He acts as a vice president at Indiana Sports Corporation, serves on the board of directors of The International Center (in Indianapolis), Indiana Chamber of Commerce, Indianapolis Bar Foundation, Junior Achievement of Central Indiana, the regional board of trustees at Ivy Tech State College and founded the Dean's Council for the School of Informatics at Indiana University. He is also a member of the advisory boards for WGU Indiana, Indiana University – Purdue University Indianapolis, the Scott College of Business at Indiana State University and the Indiana University Simon Cancer Center Translational Research Acceleration Collaboration (ITRAC). He now resides in Indianapolis with his wife and three children.

Other journalism work 
Dick is also a frequent provider of news segments regarding local business to WTHR Channel 13 Eyewitness News, with 
reports shown on programs such as Eyewitness News at 5 pm and Eyewitness News Sunrise. Additionally, he acts as a business analyst for Indianapolis television station WISH-TV and central Indiana radio station WIBC.

Awards 
In 2004, Dick was awarded the Sagamore of the Wabash (the top honor in Indiana) and received the Ernst & Young Entrepreneur of the Year award. His Inside INdiana Business news program has also received multiple Emmy Awards for "Best Interview/Discussion Program", including one for its special on the "Big Business of Craft Beer". Additionally, he has received 4 Emmy nominations for Inside INdiana Business with Gerry Dick while being recognized as "Journalist of the Year" by the Small Business Administration.  Furthermore, in 2010, his alma mater bestowed upon him a distinguished alumni award.

References

External links 
 

Journalists from Indiana
American male journalists
American business executives
Living people
Year of birth missing (living people)
People from Indianapolis